The 1970 United States Senate election in Ohio took place on November 3, 1970. Incumbent Democratic Senator Stephen M. Young did not run for re-election to a third term in office. U.S. Representative Robert Taft Jr. won the open seat over Democrat Howard Metzenbaum. 

Both Taft and Metzenbaum won very competitive primaries to gain their parties' nominations, over Governor of Ohio Jim Rhodes and astronaut John Glenn, respectively.

Democratic primary

Candidates
Kenneth W. Clement
John Glenn, member of the Mercury Seven, first American to orbit the planet Earth, and candidate for Senate in 1964
John W. McAlarney
Howard Metzenbaum, former State Senator from Lyndhurst and campaign manager for Senator Stephen Young in 1964

Results

Republican primary

Candidates
Jim Rhodes, Governor of Ohio since 1963
Robert Taft Jr., U.S. Representative from Cincinnati, scion of the Taft family, and nominee for Senate in 1964

Results

General election

Results

See also 
 1970 United States Senate elections

References

Ohio
1970
1970 Ohio elections